Singel is one of the canals of Amsterdam.

Singel may also refer to:

 Singel (album), by Lars Winnerbäck (2001)
 Amy van Singel (1949-2016), American blues journalist and radio host
 Mark Singel (born 1953), American politician
 Ryan Singel (active from 2008), American blogger and journalist

See also
 Scott VanSingel (born 1979), American politician
 Singel 24-7, a 2004 Norwegian reality TV series
 Singel 39, a 2019 Dutch romantic comedy film
 Singelgracht, a waterway around Amsterdam
 Single (disambiguation)
 The Singel Bridge at the Paleisstraat in Amsterdam, an oil painting by George Hendrik Breitner (1890s)